This is a list of German television related events from 1989.

Events
31 March - Nino de Angelo is selected to represent Germany at the 1989 Eurovision Song Contest with his song "Flieger". He is selected to be the thirty-fourth German Eurovision entry during Ein Lied für Lausanne held at the German Theatre in Munich.
9 November - ZDF's heute and ARD's Tagesschau, both widely viewed across East Germany, broadcast news of the impending fall of the Berlin Wall.

Debuts

Domestic
4 January - Peter Strohm (1989–1996) (ARD)
12 March - Molle mit Korn (1989) (ARD)
30 March - Rivalen der Rennbahn (1989) (ZDF)
11 April - Forsthaus Falkenau (1989–2013) (ZDF)
12 November - Die schnelle Gerdi, first season (1989) (ZDF)

International
31 March -  The Real Ghostbusters (1986–1991) (Sat. 1)
8 April -  DuckTales (1987–1990) (Das Erste)
30 April -  Ghostbusters (1986) (Tele 5)
14 May -  BraveStarr (1987–1988) (Tele 5)
27 August -  The Bluffers (1986) (Tele 5)
9 October -  Neighbours (1985–present) (Sat. 1)
22 November -  Doctor Who (1963-1989, 2005–present) (RTL Television)

Armed Forces Network
 Shining Time Station (1989-1993, 1995)

BFBS
8 February -  Round the Bend (1989–1991)
1 March -  Press Gang (1989–1993)
13 April -  Mike and Angelo (1989–2000)
13 April -  Children's Ward (1989–2000)
14 April -  Woof! (1989–1997)
26 April -  TUGS (1989)
28 April -  Windfalls (1989)
28 May -  The Beiderbecke Connection (1988)
29 May - / The Heroes (1989)
1 June -  Grim Tales (1989–1991)
29 September - / The Ghost of Faffner Hall (1989)
2 October -  Bodger & Badger (1989–1999)
30 October -  Bangers and Mash (1989)
30 November -  The Riddlers (1989–1998)
 Barney (1988–1989)
 Home and Away (1988–present)
 Huxley Pig (1989–1990)
 When Will I Be Famous? (1989)

Television shows

1950s
Tagesschau (1952–present)

1960s
 heute (1963-present)

1970s
 heute-journal (1978-present)
 Tagesthemen (1978-present)

1980s
Wetten, dass..? (1981-2014)
Lindenstraße (1985–present)

Ending this year

Births

Deaths